Poblacht Chríostúil (meaning "Christian Republic") was a small Irish political party active in Munster in the 1960s, advocating Catholic social teaching, a planned economy, and national self-sufficiency. It was founded in 1957, and in the 1960 local elections it stood three candidates for Cork City Council, gaining 209 votes out of 22,024, and three in Waterford City Council, gaining 328 votes. 

In 1964 in Youghal it published Intíreachas: the Social and Economic Policy of Poblacht Chríostúil, which was reviewed sympathetically in Comhar by Seán Ó Brádaigh, prompting replies from Art Ua Laoire, a Limerick party member. 

In 1965, Poblacht Chríostúil ran Sylvester Cotter in Cork Mid in a Dáil by-election and the ensuing general election, and Alexander Miller in the general election in Cork Borough, losing their deposits each time. Eoghan Harris campaigned for the party and spoke at its rallies. Sylvester Cotter subsequently joined Fine Gael and was elected to Cork County Council in 1991.

References

Defunct political parties in the Republic of Ireland
Politics of County Cork
Politics of Waterford (city)
1957 establishments in Ireland
Political parties established in 1957
1960s in the Republic of Ireland
Catholic social teaching
Christian socialist organizations